The Motorola International Bintan was an Asian Tour men's professional golf tournament that was played from 22 to 25 March 2007. It was one of three tournaments in Indonesia on the 2007 Asian Tour schedule, two of which were new. It took place at the Gary Player-designed Ria Bintan Golf Club on the island of Bintan, which is a 55-minute ferry ride from Singapore.

Winners

References

Golf tournaments in Indonesia
Former Asian Tour events